The 2015 Grand National (officially known as the 2015 Crabbie's Grand National for sponsorship reasons) was the 168th annual running of the Grand National horse race at Aintree Racecourse near Liverpool, England. The showpiece steeplechase took place on 11 April 2015, the final day of a three-day meeting. A field of 39 runners competed for a share of the £1 million prize fund, and all returned safely to the stables following the race.

The 2015 National was won by Many Clouds, ridden by Leighton Aspell and trained by Oliver Sherwood. This was Aspell's second consecutive Grand National victory, having won aboard Pineau de Re in 2014. Many Clouds is owned by Trevor Hemmings, who also owned the winners in 2005 and 2011.

The race was sponsored by ginger-beer producer Crabbie's for the second year. It was broadcast live on television by Channel 4, which took over the television rights after 2012; and on radio by BBC Radio, which has held the radio rights since 1927, and Talksport, which was covering the race live for the second time.

Race card

Entries for the 2015 Grand National closed on 3 February 2015 and 98 entrants were announced the following day, down from the record 115 that had been received for the 2014 race. Prior to the handicap announcement one horse was scratched, while another was ruled out as unqualified. Handicap weights were announced by the British Horseracing Authority in London on 17 February. A scratching deadline on 3 March saw the total number of horses reduced to 87; the second scratching deadline on 24 March reduced the field to 74. The five-day confirmation stage took place on 6 April and left 65 potential runners, reduced to 40 on 9 April.

One horse, number 14 Carlito Brigante, was subsequently declared a non-runner, reducing the field to 39 – the first time since 2004 that the maximum 40 did not start.

Great Britain unless stated.
Amateur jockeys denoted by preceding title, e.g. Mr.

Robbie McNamara was due to ride Lord Windermere but withdrew due to injury.

Race overview

The race saw a larger than usual number of fallers on the first lap, including the favoured Balthazar King, whose fall at the Canal Turn led to the field being diverted around that fence on the final lap. Jockey Ruby Walsh (whose horse Ballycasey was brought down) helped stewards alert the field to the diversion. Balthazar King suffered broken ribs in the fall.

Many eyes were on Tony McCoy on the favourite Shutthefrontdoor on what was his last Grand National. He told the media he would retire immediately after the race if he won but his mount ran out of stamina on the home turn and eventually finished fifth.

It was left to Many Clouds, ridden by Leighton Aspell, to come through to win the race.	 Aspell became the first rider to win successive Nationals since Brian Fletcher rode Red Rum to victory in 1973 and 1974. Saint Are finished second, with Monbeg Dude third, and Alvarado fourth for the second time. Pineau de Re, the previous year's winner and now ridden by Daryl Jacob, finished 12th.

Finishing order

Nineteen runners completed the course as follows:

Non-finishers

Broadcasting and media

With Clare Balding unavailable to present Channel 4's coverage, due to her BBC commitments as The Boat Race was unusually held on the same day, Nick Luck therefore led the coverage, being the first male lead presenter of the race since 1999. Luck's usual role of anchoring the event from the trackside studio was filled by Emma Spencer, supported by Jim McGrath and Graham Cunningham. Reports were provided by Mick Fitzgerald and Alice Plunkett and betting updates by Tanya Stevenson and Brian Gleeson. To broaden the scope of its coverage, flat racing jockey Frankie Dettori joined the team as a guest reporter for race day and more emphasis was placed on style and fashion of racegoers and celebrities, with fashion expert Gok Wan presenting segments on both race day and the preceding 'Ladies Day' on the festival meeting.

The commentary team was by Richard Hoiles, Ian Bartlett and Simon Holt, who called the winner home for the third time. Following the race, Spencer, Fitzgerald and Hoiles guided viewers on a fence-by-fence analysis of the race.

Further Channel 4 programming in the build-up to the race included special editions of chatshow Alan Carr: Chatty Man and Sunday Brunch, the latter being shown under the title of Weekend Brunch, with segments of the programme coming direct from Aintree.

The BBC continued an unbroken run of 83 consecutive renewals of the race to be broadcast live on radio, dating back to 1927. The race was part of its 5 Live Sport broadcast, presented by Mark Pougatch with pre-race build-up from former National riders Andrew Thornton and Luke Harvey. Cornelius Lysaght interviewed connections in the ring and Rob Nothman provided market updates. The commentary team for the race itself was Malcolm Tomlinson, Darren Owen, Gary O'Brien and John Hunt, who called the finish.

See also
Horseracing in Great Britain
List of British National Hunt races

References

External links

2015
Grand National
Grand National
21st century in Merseyside
Grand
April 2015 sports events in the United Kingdom